Sir Edward Warburton Jones PC(NI) PC QC (3 July 1912 – 17 March 1993), was a Northern Irish barrister, judge and politician.

Jones, son of a Resident Magistrate, was educated at Portora Royal School and Trinity College Dublin. He was called to the Northern Ireland Bar in 1933, took silk in 1948, and was called to the English Bar (Middle Temple) in 1964. In 1951, he was elected to the House of Commons of Northern Ireland as Unionist member for Londonderry City, and was appointed as Attorney General for Northern Ireland in 1964, and to the Privy Council of Northern Ireland in 1965, entitling him to the style "The Right Honourable".

In 1968, he resigned from Parliament and from political office upon appointment as a judge of the High Court of Northern Ireland, and then as a Lord Justice of Appeal of Northern Ireland in 1973, when he was also knighted. In 1979 he was appointed to the Privy Council of the United Kingdom. He retired in 1984 and died in 1993.

He served as a Lay Member of the General Synod of the Church of Ireland and was Chancellor of the Diocese of Derry and Raphoe from 1945 to 1964 and of the Diocese of Connor from 1959 to 1964 and from 1978 to 1981.

Death

Jones died in 1993 at Craig-y-Mor, the large coastal mansion inherited through his wife's family, in Treaddur Bay, Isle of Anglesey; he died at Headbourne Worthy. 

Sir Edward and his wife, Margaret Anne Crosland Smellie 
(died 1953), had three sons:

Peter Warburton-Jones (died 2001), barrister in England and, latterly, Northern Ireland
Anthony Graham Hume Jones, Resident Judge in Taunton
Hume Riversdale Jones (died 2007), Director of Savile in Hampshire

References

Sources
 Profile, election.demon.co.uk; accessed 9 May 2015.

1912 births
1993 deaths
20th-century British lawyers
Knights Bachelor
Alumni of Trinity College Dublin
Anglicans from Northern Ireland
Attorneys General for Northern Ireland
High Court judges of Northern Ireland
Lords Justice of Appeal of Northern Ireland
Members of the House of Commons of Northern Ireland 1949–1953
Members of the House of Commons of Northern Ireland 1953–1958
Members of the House of Commons of Northern Ireland 1958–1962
Members of the House of Commons of Northern Ireland 1962–1965
Members of the House of Commons of Northern Ireland 1965–1969
Members of the Privy Council of Northern Ireland
Members of the Privy Council of the United Kingdom
Northern Ireland junior government ministers (Parliament of Northern Ireland)
People educated at Portora Royal School
Place of birth missing
Politicians from County Londonderry
Ulster Unionist Party members of the House of Commons of Northern Ireland
Northern Ireland King's Counsel
Members of the House of Commons of Northern Ireland for County Londonderry constituencies
Members of the Bar of Northern Ireland